Canindea is a genus of longhorn beetles of the subfamily Lamiinae.

 Canindea latithorax Galileo & Martins, 1991
 Canindea maculata Galileo & Martins, 1990
 Canindea signaticornis (Buquet, 1857)

References

Calliini
Beetles described in 1857